Władysław Wysocki (24 April 1908 – 12 October 1943) was an infantry captain in the Polish People's Army and recipient of the title of Hero of Soviet Union.

Early life
Wysocki was born on 24 April 1908 in the city of Bielsk Podlaski. After graduating from gymnasium in Bielsko, he attended the Army Cadet School.

Military career
On 15 August 1931, President of the Republic of Poland Ignacy Mościcki appointed Wysocki as second lieutenant with seniority, and assigned him into a body of infantry officers in the Polish Army. Marshal of Poland Józef Piłsudski later had him transferred to the 42nd Infantry Regiment in Bialystok, and appointed him as a platoon commander on 1 September 1931.

On 22 February 1934, he was promoted to lieutenant with seniority from 1 January 1934. Two years later, he was transferred to the 77th Infantry Regiment in Lida. In 1938, he became the commander of a machine gun company.

World War II
During the 1939 invasion of Poland, Wysocki fought in the ranks of his regiment at Piotrków Trybunalski. After the fighting ended, he returned to Bielsko. In December 1939, following the Soviet invasion of Poland, he was arrested by the Soviet authorities and placed in an internment camp in USSR.

After signing of the Sikorski–Mayski agreement in 1943, Wysocki enlisted in the Polish Armed Forces in the East. However, he remained in the Soviet Union and joined the Soviet backed Polish People's Army, which was commanded by Zygmunt Berling. He was assigned to the 1st Tadeusz Kościuszko Infantry Division.

In the second half of 1943, the 1st Infantry Division moved to the front line, becoming part of the 33rd Army of Western Front. On 12 October 1943, the unit went through its baptism of fire in the Battle of Lenino.

On 12 October 1943, Wysocki assumed command of the 3rd Battalion of 1st Infantry Regiment after its commander had been killed in action. Wysocki led his unit in successfully capturing German positions, capturing the enemy's first line of defense, and wedging into the second one at the village of Trigubovo (now: Kostyushkovo). He was killed leading his soldiers in a bayonet attack, while defending his unit's position in Trigubovo.

By the decree of the Presidium of the Supreme Soviet of the USSR of 11 November 1943, Wysocki was posthumously awarded the title of Hero of the Soviet Union for the exemplary performance of combat missions on the front in fight against the German invaders, and for the courage and heroism shown at the same time.

Awards and honors
:
 Silver Cross of the Virtuti Militari (posthumous)
 Silver Cross of Merit (19 March 1937)
:
 Hero of the Soviet Union (11 November 1943, posthumous)
 Order of Lenin (11 November 1943, posthumous)

Other honors
On 4 October 1973, Polish Minister of National Defense General Wojciech Jaruzelski, named a mechanized regiment in Wesoła after Wysocki.

A primary school and street in Bielsk Podlaski, are named in honor of him. There is also a bust honoring him in Bielsk Podlaski.

References

Further reading

1908 births
1943 deaths
People from Bielsk Podlaski
People from Grodno Governorate
Recipients of the Virtuti Militari (1943–1989)
Recipients of the Silver Cross of the Virtuti Militari
Recipients of the Silver Cross of Merit (Poland)
Foreign Heroes of the Soviet Union
Recipients of the Order of Lenin
Polish military personnel killed in World War II
Polish September Campaign participants